Howard Knight may refer to
 Howard Allen Knight, an Ohio politician
 Howard A. Knight, Jr., a record producer and Entrepreneur